This is a list of notable Pakistanis who are practicing or have been practicing as a lawyer in Pakistan

 Abdul Ghafoor Bhurgri
 Ahmad Awais Advocate General Punjab
 Ahmad Raza Khan Kasuri
 Aitzaz Ahsan, barrister of Gray's Inn 
 Akhtar Aly Kureshy
 Akram Sheikh
 A. K. Brohi
 Ashtar Ausaf Ali
 Asif Ali Malik
 Asma Jahangir, Senior ASC
 Asrar-ul-Haq Mian
 Babar Awan
 Fakhruddin G. Ebrahim
 Farogh Naseem
 Hamid Khan (lawyer)
 Khalid Jawed Khan, Barrister of Lincoln's Inn
 Khalid Ranjha
 Latif Afridi
 Latif Khosa
 Liaquat Ali Khan, barrister of Inner Temple
 Mahmud Ali Kasuri
 Makhdoom Ali Khan
 Mirza Aziz Akbar Baig
 Muhammad Ali Jinnah, barrister of Lincoln's Inn
 Mumtaz Mustafa
 Naeem Bokhari
 Naseer Ahmed Bhutta
 Rana Arif Kamal Noon
 Rana Mashhood Ahmad Khan
 Rana Muhammad Akram Khan
 Rashid Rehman
 Salman Aslam Butt
 Shakeel ur Rahman Khan
 Sharifuddin Pirzada, barrister of Lincoln's Inn
 Syed Ali Zafar
 Wasim Sajjad
 Zafar Mehmood Mughal
 Zulfikar Ali Bhutto, barrister of Lincoln's Inn

References

Advocates
Punjab Bar Council
Pakistani lawyers
Lawyers